In the aftermath of the 2008 Mumbai attacks, there were multiple and far-ranging events that were observed. Besides the immediate impact on the victims and their families, the attacks caused widespread anger among the Indian public, and condemnations from countries throughout the world.

The immediate impact was felt on Mumbai and Maharashtra state, and throughout urban India. There were also after-effects on the Indian government, centre-state relations within India, Indo-Pakistani relations, domestic impact within Pakistan, the United States's relationships with both countries, the US-led NATO war in Afghanistan, and on the Global War on Terror.
There was also impact on the region of Kashmir and this also led to the 2010 Kashmir Unrest.

Immediate impact

Impact on the attack locations

The Leopold Cafe opened its doors to customers just four days after the attacks. The owners wanted to repair the damaged parts of the cafe, while retaining some of the damaged pieces as a tribute to those who lost their lives in the attacks.

Security forces handed back control of the Taj Mahal Hotel to the Taj group on 1 December 2008, and work on its repairs began that same day. Celebrated artist M.F. Hussain, whose art was destroyed in the attacks, has agreed to replace the paintings with a series that will condemn the attack. Hussain plans this series as a tribute to the staff of the hotel, who laid down their lives to save other people.

Control of the Trident has already been handed back to the management, while the Oberoi will take 3–4 months to resume operations. Both the Taj and Trident hotels reopened on 21 December 2008.

Nariman House will also reopen soon, but it is not known exactly when. Several young Chabad couples from all over the world have stepped forward to move to Mumbai and continue the movement's work.

Impact on Mumbai

In the aftermath of the November 2008 Mumbai attacks, all schools and colleges, and most offices were closed. The Bombay Stock Exchange and National Stock Exchange remained closed on 27 November 2008. Shooting of Bollywood films and TV series had also been halted in the city. Many international airlines temporarily discontinued operations to Mumbai, in the interest of passenger and crew safety.

The Indian Cricket League's ongoing tournament in Ahmedabad was canceled. The two remaining One Day Internationals of the seven match series between the visiting England cricket team and India were cancelled. The visiting team flew home, but returned to continue the test series. However, the venue of the second India-England test match, scheduled on 19–23 December, was shifted from Mumbai to Chennai. The inaugural Twenty20 Champions League, scheduled from 3 to 10 December, Mumbai being one of the host cities, was postponed. The attacks have brought into significance the issue of 379 Indian boats and 336 fishermen apprehended by the Pakistan marine agency, for entering their waters. Nearly 200 of the boats have reportedly been auctioned, now recognised as a national security issue for India. On 28 November, Pakistan released 99 fishermen who were apprehended, as part of confidence building measures with India. There were threats to blow up ITC Fortune Hotel in Navi Mumbai, after Mumbai police received a bomb threat from terrorists. Rumours about further shootings at Chhatrapati Shivaji Terminus were doing the rounds in Mumbai on 28 November, and were widely reported by the news channels. The Railway Police denied these rumours, but stopped trains approaching CST.

Maharashtra state government 
Maharashtra's chief minister Vilasrao Deshmukh angered public after he toured terrorist destroyed Taj hotel with his actor son Riteish Deshmukh and film director Ram Gopal Varma. It is reported that Varma wanted to make film on 26/11 with Riteish Deshmukh and thats why he toured Taj hotel. Public expressed it as an insensitive act done by Deshmukh and his son. Due to public angar, criticism Vilasrao Deshmukh had resigned as chief minister. He never became chief minister again. The deputy chief minister- Home minister R. R. Patil during attacks got criticized for his comments on the attacks during a press conference in which he downplayed terrorist attack by using a Hindi film dialogue "Bade, Bade shaharome, esi choti choti bate hoti reheti he", he said“Small things do happen in big cities. They wanted to kill 5,000 people, we have minimised the damage",   and mishandle situation amid attacks, after political backlash, he resigned on 1 Dec 2008. Union Home minister Shivaraj Patil also resigned. 

After seeing the disparity between the quality of helmets and bulletproof vests used by NSG commandos and the police, the Police Commissioner of Pune, Satyapal Singh, said his police officers needed the same quality equipment as used by the NSG to reduce deaths and improve performance.

Maharashtra government has planned to buy 36 speed boats to patrol the coastal areas, and several helicopters for the same purpose. It will also create an Anti-Terror force known as the Force One, and it will upgrade all the weapons that Mumbai Police currently have.

The CST railway station was upgraded with metal detectors, but reports say that these are ineffective because the attendants cannot hear their beeps in the crowd. Civilians have tested these using their own licensed weapons.

Maharashtra's new Home Minister, Jayant Patil, was forced to defend the performance of the police in the legislative assembly, against demands from the opposition parties for resignations from the police chief and other officials.

In an attempt to take forward the 26/11 probe, the Mumbai Police will send a three members team to the United States in this regard, sources said. The team comprising Inspector Bharti, Inspector Kadam and Inspector Arun Chavan will share the findings of 26 November 2008 Mumbai attacks, with apex US investigative agency FBI. Mumbai police have sent a proposal to the Home Ministry, stating the need to establish direct contact with the FBI, to facilitate investigation in the Mumbai terror attacks. It is believed that the team, if permitted to go, will share the evidence gathered by Mumbai police, which prove Pakistan's hand in the attacks on the nation's integrity.

After-effects

Government of India

A Cabinet Committee on Security meeting was held on Tuesday, 2 December, to discuss expanding the National Security Guards (NSG) to cities outside Delhi. The aim is to have permanent presence of NSG anti-terrorist squads in cities such as Mumbai, Chennai, Bangalore, Hyderabad and Kolkata, to avoid wasting precious time travelling from Delhi.

All NSG commandos will now undergo a new module of training, to learn how to deal with future anti-siege operations, because the Taj terrorists were in a gun battle for 59 hours continuously.

Prime Minister Dr. Manmohan Singh, on an all party conference, declared that legal framework will be strengthened in the battle against terrorism and a federal anti-terrorist intelligence and investigation agency, like the FBI, will soon be set up to co-ordinate actions against terrorism. On 17 December, the Lok Sabha approved two new anti-terror bills, which are expected to pass the upper house (Rajya Sabha) on the 19th. One sets up a National Investigation Agency, similar to the FBI, with sweeping powers of investigation. The second strengthens existing anti-terror laws, to allow suspects to be detained without bail for up to six months, on the orders of a judge.

Banned Pakistani cricketers 
After the attacks Board of Control for Cricket in India (BCCI) banned Pakistani players from taking part in Indian Premier League. Since then no Pakistani player played in IPL.

Centre-State relations
The National Investigation Agency Bill, 2008, sets up a central agency for investigating terrorism related crimes. However, law and order is a state subject in the Constitution of India, which had made such a law difficult to pass in the past.

Union Home Minister P. Chidambaram assured parliament that the National Investigation Agency (NIA) did not usurp the States' right in any manner. The central government would make use of its power only under "extraordinary" circumstances, and depending on the gravity of the situation, he said. "The agency will also have the powers to return the investigations to the State, if it so thinks. We have struck a balance between the right of the States and duties of the Centre to investigate."

Indo-Pakistani relations

The attacks have damaged India's already strained relationship with Pakistan. India handed over two demarches to Pakistan—one was submitted at the Foreign Office in Islamabad by Indian High Commissioner Satyabrata Pal. The Indian Ministry of External Affairs also summoned Pakistan High Commissioner Shahid Malik on 1 December 2008, to lodge a formal protest over Pakistan's failure to curb terrorism emanating from its soil. According to the Indian External Affairs Minister, Pranab Mukherjee, India, in the demarches to Pakistan, asked for the arrest and handover of those 20 persons, including gangster Dawood Ibrahim, the founder of Jaish-e-Mohammad, terrorist leader Maulana Masood Azhar and Lashkar-e-Taiba, and chief Hafiz Muhammad Saeed, who are settled in Pakistan and who are fugitives of Indian law. The external affairs minister has also stated that India will await Pakistan's response. He has not ruled out the option of military strikes against terrorist camps in Pakistan.

On 28 November, a hoax caller pretending to be the Indian Foreign Minister threatened Pakistan President Zardari with war, leading to the Pakistan military being put in high alert. Military aircraft with live ammunition were scrambled to patrol above Islamabad and Rawalpindi.

Requests for Pakistan's cooperation

India's claims that the perpetrators were Pakistan-based were consistently denied by Pakistan. Pakistan initially contested this attribution, but agreed this was the case on 7 January 2009. The Indian government supplied a dossier to Pakistan's high commission in Delhi, containing interrogations, weapons, and call records of conversations during the attacks. Shown to friendly governments and media, it provides a detailed sequence of training, supplying, and constant communications with handlers from Pakistan. The Pakistan government dismissed the dossier as "not evidence", but also announced that it had detained over a hundred members of Jamaat-ud-Dawa, a charity linked with Lashkar-e-Taiba. Moreover, Indian government officials said that the attacks were so sophisticated that they must have had official backing from Pakistani "agencies". an accusation denied by Pakistan.

At the request of Indian Prime Minister Manmohan Singh, the head of Pakistan's Inter-Services Intelligence (ISI), Ahmad Shuja Pasha, was reported to be coming to India to share intelligence and help the investigation, but later on it was decided by Pakistani authorities that instead of Director General of the ISI, his representative will visit India to help the Indian government in the investigations.

India handed over two demarches to Pakistan – one was submitted at the Foreign Office in Islamabad by Indian High Commissioner Satyabrata Pal. The Indian Ministry of External Affairs also summoned Pakistan High Commissioner Shahid Malik on 1 December 2008, to lodge a formal protest against Pakistan's inaction against terrorist groups operating within the country.

The Indian foreign ministry released a statement, describing the actions it expects Islamabad to take. "It was conveyed to the Pakistan high commissioner that Pakistan's actions needed to match the sentiments expressed by its leadership, that it wishes to have a qualitatively new relationship with India," the statement said. "He was informed that the recent terrorist attack on Mumbai was carried out by elements from Pakistan. Government expects that strong action would be taken against those elements, whosoever they may be, responsible for this outrage," it said.

The CNN-IBN reported that India had asked Pakistan to hand over Mumbai Underworld Don Dawood Ibrahim, Lashkar-e-Toiba chief Hafiz Muhammad Saeed and Jaish-e-Mohammed leader Maulana Masood Azhar for their suspected involvement in the Mumbai terror attack.

Dawood, India's most wanted criminal, is suspected to have helped the LeT terrorists who attacked Mumbai on 26 November. Azhar, founder of the terrorist group Jaish-e-Mohammad, is on India's most wanted list of people it accuses of terrorism. India freed Azhar from prison in exchange for passengers on a hijacked Indian Airlines Flight 814 in 1999.

Times of India, quoting Indian External Affairs Minister Pranab Mukherjee, reported: "Now, we have in our demarche asked (for) the arrest and handover of those persons who are settled in Pakistan and who are fugitives of Indian law"

"...there are lists of about 20 persons. (These) lists are sometimes altered and this exercise is going on and we have renewed it in our demarche", Mukherjee said, adding that India "will await" Pakistan's response in the Indian-Arab forum.

In an interview with NDTV, Pranab Mukherjee had not ruled out the option of military strikes against terror camps in Pakistan. Mukherjee said that every country has the right to protect its territorial integrity, and take appropriate action when necessary. He also said that it has become difficult to continue the peace process with Pakistan in this.

Denials from Pakistan
Pakistan claimed that it had not received any letter from Mohammad Ajmal Amir, the lone terrorist arrested for the Mumbai attacks, seeking legal aid. It also repeated its denial on his Pakistani nationality, saying it needed "incontrovertible" evidence.

The Mumbai police had said that the captured terrorist Ajmal Amir had written a letter to the Pakistan High Commission in India, asking for help, and that the letter had been given to India's central government. But the Pakistan High Commissioner to India, Shahid Malik, told Karan Thapar in the "India Tonight" program of CNBC TV-18, that no such letter had been received.

According to Pakistan's Dawn newspaper, Ajmal's father in Pakistan had admitted that the man seen in photographs at the CST railway station was indeed his son. But the High Commissioner said they needed "something which is incontrovertible, which cannot be challenged in a court of law".

Pakistan was also not contemplating giving Zaki-ur-Rahman Lakhvi, the alleged mastermind of the Mumbai attacks, access to the FBI for investigation.

Interpol involvement
Shortly after the Mumbai attacks, the Interpol team visited India and "promised help in securing the details of the 10 gunmen who attacked several places in Mumbai, 26 November, leaving at least 173 people dead and more than 300 others injured".

Interpol Secretary General Ronald Noble arrived in Islamabad on Tuesday, 23 December, for talks over Indian allegations of involvement with Pakistan-based militant groups in the Mumbai terror attacks. Interpol secretary general Ronald Noble met Pakistan's security officials the same day.

However, in a later press-conference, the Interpol chief said that India didn't share any specific information with the Interpol regarding the terror attacks. He said that Interpol had the same information that had been with media and the general public. Pakistan's Minister for Information and Broadcasting Sherry Rehman claimed that this statement somehow supported Pakistan government's stance that Indian government has yet to share substantial and credible evidence with them, and again offered help in due cooperation to India, for joint investigations into the Mumbai attacks.

On 10 March, India gave Interpol the DNA of the attackers.

Military preparations

On 7 December, US Senator John McCain relayed a message from Prime Minister Manmohan Singh, to a group of Pakistanis at a lunch in Lahore, that if Pakistan did not arrest those involved with the attacks, India would begin aerial attacks against Pakistan.

Pakistan Information Minister Sherry Rehman said that "Our air force is on alert, and ready to face any eventuality". Ali Abbas Rizvi quoted a source as saying, "They [India] may have wanted to know whether the PAF was on five-minute alert or cockpit alert, and thereby find out the reaction time".

On 19 December, private intelligence agency Stratfor, in its latest report, said, "Indian military operations against targets in Pakistan have in fact been prepared, and await the signal to go forward". They also wrote that, "Indian military preparations, unlike previous cases, will be carried out in stealth". India's Border Security Force (BSF) has been put on high alert on the western sector, as well as the eastern sector, in order to prevent terrorist infiltration.

On 22 December, Pakistan began combat air patrol (CAP) over several cities, including Islamabad, Lahore, and Rawalpindi, which began a panic among Pakistani civilians. Many Pakistani civilians "started making frantic phone calls to media house[s] to enquire about whether a war has been declared". Pakistani Foreign Minister Shah Mehmood Qureshi said, "Pakistan defence forces and armed forces are ready to face any challenge, as Pak has the full right to defend itself". Pakistani PM Yousuf Raza Gilani said, "Pakistan remains united and is ready to fight anyone to defend itself". Pakistani Defense Minister Ahmad Mukhtar Chaudhry said, "If India tried to thrust war, then the armed forces of Pakistan have all the potential and right to defend [Pakistan]".

According to Pakistani media, India had started deploying troops along the Rajasthan border, and had tightened security in and around the defence airstrips. More radars and quick reaction teams were then deployed along the India-Pakistan border. Indian forces were on regular firing exercises at locations, like Lathi Firing Range in Jaisalmer, Mahsan in Bikaner, Suratgarh and Ganganagar.

On 23 December, Kamal Hyder, Al Jazeera's correspondent in Pakistan, wrote that the Pakistani "navy, air force and army were on red alert" and that "the chiefs of Pakistan's three armed forces were holding what had been described as an emergency meeting at general headquarters in Rawalpindi". He also wrote that "[t]he Pakistani air force have been seen visibly in a number of locations flying close to the Pakistani-India border, in what is being described as an aggressive patrolling mode, following reports that India is planning pre-emptive strikes against locations in Pakistan". A Pakistani airforce spokesperson said "[i]n view of the current environment, the PAF has enhanced its vigilance". Pakistani army chief General Ashfaq Parvez Kayani, said that Pakistan would mount an equal response "within minutes", to any Indian attack. Pakistan continued to combat air patrol over several cities.

The Taliban and affiliated groups openly declared their solidarity with Pakistan. The banned Tehrik-e-Taliban had proclaimed that they would send "thousands of (their) well-armed militants" in order to wage jihad against India if war should break out. Hundreds of would-be bombers were equipped with suicide jackets and explosive-laden vehicles.

On 24 December, P.K. Barbora, the air officer commanding-in-chief of Western Air Command, said "[t]he IAF has earmarked 5,000 targets in Pakistan. But whether we will cross the LoC or the International Border to hit the enemy targets will have to be decided by the political leadership of the country". India Today reported that "Indian Air Force fighter planes are engaged in round the clock sorties. An unusual hectic activity of Indian Air Force has been visible along the border for past some days". On the same day, Stratfor confirmed that "the state government of Rajasthan has ordered residents of its border villages to be prepared for relocation". President Asif Ali Zardari said "We will defend the country till the last drop of our blood", and "[w]e will defend the country till our last breath". Pakistan began deploying warplanes to forward air bases.

On 25 December, however, the ruling UPA government in India played down apprehensions of an imminent military conflagration. The Indian Prime Minister made it clear that "nobody wanted war". The Indian Air Force also downplayed the sorties by PAF fighter jets, saying it was an air defence exercise. Officials in New Delhi were amused at Pakistan air force's attempt to create war hysteria in the region. However, R. C. Dhyani, DIG of Rajasthan frontier BSF, said, "[a] lot of military movement is being noticed in districts just across the international border for the last few days, which is not normal" and "Pakistan has deployed more troops across border".

Leader of the House Raza Rabbani, said that any surgical strike into its territory would be taken as an act of war and would be repulsed with "full force", and that "[e]ach and every inch of the country will be safeguarded". India moved MiG-29s to Hindon air base, located near New Delhi, in order "to protect the capital from aerial threats". The Pakistani city of Mianwali began a blackout.

Pakistan continued deployment, and moved the 10th Brigade to the outskirts of Lahore, and the 3rd Armored Brigade to Jhelum. The 10th Infantry Division and the 11th Infantry Division had been placed on high alert. The Indian Army deployed quick reaction teams (QRTs) along the border, which "precede the movement of bridging equipment – to cross canals in Punjab – and of heavy guns".

Amir Mir of Daily News and Analysis wrote that "Pakistan's military leadership has advised president Asif Ali Zardari to take back his statement made last month, that his country would not be the first to use nuclear weapons in the event of a conflict with India".

On 26 December, Pakistan cancelled all military leave, and activated contacts with friendly countries and military partners. Pakistan deployed troops to "protect vital points along the Line of Control (LoC) in Jammu and Kashmir and the international border with India". Pakistani Foreign Minister Quresh said that, "if war is imposed, we will respond to it like a brave, self-respecting nation". Indian Prime Minister Manmohan Singh held a second meeting of the Nuclear Command Authority to "discuss all the options available to India".

Pakistan deployed the 14th Infantry Division to Kasur and Sialkot, close to the border. India advised its citizens not to travel to Pakistan. Indian Prime Minister Manmohan Singh met with the chiefs of the Indian air force, army, and navy.

On 27 December, India's largest opposition party, the Bharatiya Janata Party (BJP), called for all travel between India and Pakistan to be stopped, and for the recall of the Indian High Commissioner from Pakistan. The Pakistani Army alerted retired army personnel to be ready to be called back to active duty. On 28 December, Pakistan postponed all officer training courses.

On 29 December, the leaders of the Indian and Pakistani armies spoke over their red telephone, in order to avert an accidental nuclear war. The President of the BJP, Rajnath Singh, called for a joint India-US military action against Pakistan. John McCain said, "The Indians are on the verge of some kind of attack on Pakistan".

On 30 December, Pakistani media stated: "The service chiefs of all of the branches of India's military were told to stay in the country in order to achieve 'complete readiness'. All units that are on exercises have been ordered to remain so indefinitely, and to indicate any equipment or ammunition they need". However, this was not backed by Indian nor international media.

Pakistani deployments
The Pakistani military had cancelled all leave. Elements of the Pakistani Airforce had been deployed to frontline bases. The IV Corp, with 60,000 troops, has been deployed to Lahore. Pakistan had deployed the 3rd Armored Brigade to Jhelum, and the 10th Brigade, with 5,000 troops, to Lahore. The 10th Division had been deployed to Ichogul and the 11th Division had been deployed to Tilla. Pakistani Army units had been deployed to Kashmir and the Jammu sector of the border. The 14th Division, with 20,000 troops, had been deployed to Kasur and Sialkot.

Indian deployments
India had put its Border Security Force, India's border patrol agency, on high alert. Mig-29s have been deployed to Hindon air base, in order to protect New Delhi. Later IAF sources claimed that the move was a result of intelligence inputs of an air attack on Delhi. The Indian Navy had moved six warships, including the INS Jalashwa and the INS Ranveer, to the west coast.

Trials in Pakistan
Indian and Pakistani police had exchanged DNA evidence, photographs, and items found with the attackers, to piece together a detailed portrait of the Mumbai plot. Police in Pakistan had arrested seven people, including Hammad Amin Sadiq, a homoeopathic pharmacist, who arranged bank accounts and secured supplies, and he and six others began their formal trial on 3 October 2009, in Pakistan, though Indian authorities say the prosecution stopped well short of top Lashkar leaders.

Impact on the United States
US officials feared that should the firm evidence emerge that the Mumbai terror attacks were planned and directed from within Pakistan, it would certainly escalate tension between the neighbouring countries, and could also provoke an Indian military response, even strikes against terrorists, a media report said on Saturday. US Secretary of State Condoleezza Rice, on Monday, urged Pakistan to give its "absolute, total" cooperation in finding those responsible for last week's attacks on Mumbai. Rice travelled to India on 4 December 2008, at the request of President George W. Bush, in the wake of the Mumbai attacks. She said that there is need for "direct and tough action" by Islamabad, even if the perpetrators of the Mumbai terror attacks were "non-state actors".
"Secretary Rice's visit to India is a further demonstration of the United States' commitment to stand in solidarity with the people of India, as we all work together to hold these extremists accountable", White House spokeswoman Dana Perino said in a statement.

After visiting India, Condoleezza Rice travelled to Pakistan on 4 December 2008, to talk with the Pakistani government. She is quoted as saying, "We talked at length about the importance of Pakistan taking its responsibility to deal with those who may use Pakistan territory even if they are non-state actors".

However, some of the most wanted names on the list continue to operate openly in Pakistan. No action has been taken against them by the government of Pakistan.

Police forces in places like New York and Boston practised handling of similar situations, should they occur in the US.

Impact on the United Kingdom
In the wake of the attacks, a new system of compensation for British citizens caught up in terrorist attacks is being considered. However, "currently the UK government does not guarantee compensation for people injured in attacks abroad".

British police feared similar attacks could occur in the country.

Citizens' movements
The Mumbai attack also triggered a chain of citizens' movements across India. People from all walks of life hit the streets with candles and placards to pay tributes to the victims of the tragedy almost every weekend after the 26/11 incident. While NSG commandos, Mumbai police officials, hotel staffers, etc. who participated in the operation to eliminate the terrorists became overnight heroes, the wrath of the citizens was directed towards the Government's inability to ensure adequate security to its citizens, and soon led to the chain of resignations, including that of the Indian Home Minister, Shivraj Patil. The gathering of citizens at the Gateway of India in Mumbai was unprecedented and historic. From India Gate and Jantar Mantar in New Delhi to marketplaces and street corners all across the country, India witnessed candlelight vigils by the common people. Some organised initiatives to carry forward the citizens' movement included a Hindustan Times-CNN-IBN Initiative, India Today Group's War Against Terror, and Hindustan Hamara Citizens' Initiative, besides a large number of blogs on the issue.

February 2009 video release
On 25 February 2009, new videos of CCTV were released, displaying the inside of the hotel where the Mumbai siege took place.

See also
 Force One (Mumbai Police)
 Abdul Rauf Asghar
 Devika Rotawan

References

2008 Mumbai attacks
Mumbai attacks